"1980" is the debut single of British rapper and singer-songwriter Estelle and lead single from her debut album, The 18th Day (2004). In the song, which samples Tony Orlando and Dawn's "Lazy Susan", Estelle talks about her childhood in London; she titled the song "1980" for the year she was born. The single reached number 14 on the UK Singles Chart and was the highest-charting single from her debut album. The single also reached number 36 in Australia and Sweden. Estelle performed the song during her set at the BBC 1Xtra urban music event.

Music video
The music video for "1980" depicts events that took place in Estelle's younger years, which are featured in the lyrics of the song. The video features members of Estelle's family and leads into album track and the B-side for "1980", "Don't Talk" at the end of the video. This video, as well as the video for follow-up single "Free", was directed by Andy Hylton.

Track listing
UK and Australian CD single
 "1980" – 3:59
 "Don't Talk" – 3:38
 "Don't Talk" (remix) – 3:40

Charts

Release history

References

2004 debut singles
2004 songs
Estelle (musician) songs
Songs about childhood
Songs written by Estelle (musician)
Songs written by Kevin Veney
Songs written by Linda Creed
Songs written by Rich Shelton
Songs written by Thom Bell
UK Independent Singles Chart number-one singles
V2 Records singles